Thiébaut or Thiebaut is a surname of French origin that may refer to:

Bill Thiebaut (born 1947), American politician from Colorado
Gunter Thiebaut (born 1977), Belgian soccer player
Jean-Luc Thiébaut (born 1960), French handball player
Léon Thiébaut (1878–1943), French fencer

See also
 Thibaud (disambiguation)
 Thibault (disambiguation)
 Thibaut
 Thibeault (disambiguation)
 
 

French-language surnames